The 2021 Henry 180 was the 17th stock car race of the 2021 NASCAR Xfinity Series season, and the 12th iteration of the event. The race was held on Saturday, July 3, 2021 at Elkhart Lake, Wisconsin in Road America, a  permanent road course. The race took 45 laps to complete. After suffering damage, Kyle Busch of Kyle Busch Motorsports would rally back to the front and would win his 101st career NASCAR Xfinity Series race and his fourth of the season. To fill out the podium positions, Daniel Hemric of Joe Gibbs Racing and Michael Annett of JR Motorsports would finish 2nd and 3rd, respectively.

Background

Practice 
The first and final practice took place on Friday, July 2. Austin Cindric would set the fastest time in the session with a 2 minute and 15.096 second lap.

Qualifying 
Qualifying would take place on Saturday, July 3, at 12:23 EST. Ty Gibbs would win the pole with a 2 minute and 15.520 second lap.

7 drivers would fail to qualify: the #66 of Matt Jaskol, the #52 of Gray Gaulding, the #0 of Jeffrey Earnhardt, the #15 of Colby Howard, the #61 of Boris Said, the #47 of Kyle Weatherman, and the #74 of Bayley Currey.

Race

Race results 
Stage 1 Laps: 14

Stage 2 Laps: 15

Stage 3 Laps: 16

References 

2021 NASCAR Xfinity Series
NASCAR races at Road America
Henry 180
Henry 180